Belhezar-e Pain (also Romanized as Belhezār-e Pā’īn; also known as Belhezar-e Soflá) is a village in Qarah Chaman Rural District, Arzhan District, Shiraz County, Fars Province, Iran. At the 2006 census, its population was 33, in 9 families.

References 

Populated places in Shiraz County